Frei de Távora or Fernando de Tavora was a Portuguese clergyman and bishop for the Roman Catholic Diocese of Funchal. He was ordained in 1569. He was resigned in 1573. He died in 1577.

References 

1577 deaths
Portuguese Roman Catholic bishops